Goñi may refer to:

 Goñi, Navarre, a village in northern Spain
 Almirante Goñi, the former name of the ship HMS Broke (1914)

People with the surname
 Adrien Goñi (born 1988), Spanish football player
 Ainhoa Goñi (born 1979), Spanish tennis player
 Ana Goñi (born 1953), Venezuelan rally driver
 Antonio Peña y Goñi (1846–1896), Spanish musicologist
 Ascensión Nicol y Goñi (1868–1940), Spanish Roman Catholic religious sister
 Carlos Goñi Zubieta (born 1963), Spanish philosopher, writer and teacher
 Ernesto Goñi (born 1985), Uruguayan football player
 Eñaut Zubikarai (born 1984), Spanish football player
 Gonzalo Goñi (born 1998), Argentinian football player
 Iker Muniain (born 1992), Spanish football player
 Iosu Goñi Leoz Leoz (born 1990), Spanish handball player
 Itsaso Leunda (born 1984), Spanish racing cyclist
 Javier Goñi Lopéz (born 1986), Spanish swimmer
 José Goñi, Chilean diplomat and politician
 Mayra Goñi, Peruvian actress and singer
 Ricardo Sanzol (born 1976), Spanish football player
 Samuel Goñi (born 1994), Spanish football player
 Tomás Garicano Goñi (1919–1988), Spanish military lawyer, governor and politician
 Uki Goñi (born 1953), Argentinian author
 Wilson Elso Goñi (1938–2009), Uruguayan politician

See also
 Goni (disambiguation)